This is a list of the Austrian Singles Chart number-one hits of 2007.

See also
2007 in music

References

2007 in Austria
Austria Singles
2007